The Faroe–Shetland Channel is stretch of the North Atlantic lying between the two island groups of Shetland and the Faroe Islands.  The channel is a rift basin that separates the Scottish and the Faroese continental shelves, and has a maximum depth of 1900 m, compared to the surrounding seabed which mostly lies at 200 m. It was first noted by Charles Wyville Thomson during the mid-nineteenth century.

Strategically, the channel forms part of the GIUK gap.

Nature and conservation
Since 2014 two parts of the channel lying with Scottish Offshore Waters have been designated as Nature Conservation Marine Protected Areas:

The sponges, which are found on the slopes of the channel at depths of between 400 and 600 m, provide a sheltered habitat that supports creatures such as brittlestars, squat lobsters and burrowing heart urchins. Sand and gravel beds within the channel also support ocean quahog, a large and slow growing clam which have a lifespan of more than 400 years and are thus considered to be amongst the oldest living animals on Earth.
This part of the channel is considered to be an important migratory route for marine mammals such as fin and sperm whales. This part of the channel is also of note for its geological features, which include a series of deep-water mud volcanoes known as the pilot whale diapirs.

See also
Wyville Thomson Ridge

References

Citations

Bibliography

Nature Conservation Marine Protected Areas of Scotland
Oceanic trenches of the Atlantic Ocean
Geology of Scotland